Financial Services Act may refer to:
 Financial Services Act 1986, of the Parliament of the United Kingdom
 Financial Services Act 2010, of the Parliament of the United Kingdom
 Financial Services Act 2012, of the Parliament of the United Kingdom